Alastair Taylor (born 13 September 1991) is an English footballer who plays as a midfielder for Grantham Town.

Playing career 
Taylor joined Barnsley aged 8 and was named Academy Player of the Year in 2009–10. He made his professional debut for the club on 24 April 2010, replacing Nathan Doyle 81 minutes into a 1–0 defeat by Queens Park Rangers at Oakwell. In October 2011, he joined Worksop Town on loan.

Following his release from Barnsley after the 2011–12 season he signed for Conference Premier side Alfreton Town on 9 August 2012. He made his first appearance for Alfreton on 25 August in a 3–1 victory away at Barrow, almost scoring with a 25-yard effort. He made a further 12 appearances over the course of the season and was given a new one-year contract in May 2013.

He made his first appearance of the 2013–14 season as a late substitute in Alfreton's 3–1 defeat to Grimsby Town. With his opportunities limited at Alfreton, Taylor joined Conference North side Gainsborough Trinity on a one-month loan in October 2013. He scored his first senior goal in a 3–2 defeat to Solihull Moors and made a total of four appearances before returning to Alfreton in November. Having started only one of Alfreton's nine league games since his return, Taylor rejoined Gainsborough on loan for a month in late December. After a further five appearances he returned to Alfreton though he soon left the club on loan again, this time joining Northern Premier League Premier Division side Buxton.

Career statistics

Honours 
Barnsley
Academy Player of the Year: 2009–10

References

External links 
Alastair Taylor profile at Alfreton Town F.C.

1991 births
Living people
Footballers from Sheffield
English footballers
Association football midfielders
Barnsley F.C. players
Worksop Town F.C. players
Alfreton Town F.C. players
Gainsborough Trinity F.C. players
Buxton F.C. players
Handsworth F.C. players
Grantham Town F.C. players
English Football League players
National League (English football) players
Northern Premier League players